is a Japanese violinist.

Biography 
She began playing the violin at the age of four and joined the Toho Gakuen School of Music in 2005. In 2006, she was second prize winner at the XIII Henryk Wieniawski Violin Competition. Suzuki performed her debut recital at Yokosuka in the spring of 2005, and is studying at the Hanover University of Music, Drama and Media with Krzysztof Wegrzyn. In the past, she performed with the Tokyo Symphony Orchestra, New Japan Philharmonic Orchestra, Sendai Philharmonic Orchestra, and Poznan Philharmonic Orchestra. She won fifth prize at the Joseph Joachim International Violin Competition Hannover in 2012.

Competitions and awards 
 10th Violin competition for children: Gold Prize in 1998
 10th Japan Classic Music Competition: 2nd Prize (no 1st Prize) in 2000
 57th All Japan Student Music Competition: 1st Prize in 2003
 13th Henryk Wieniawski Violin Competition: 2nd Prize in 2006
 8th Joseph Joachim International Violin Competition Hannover: 5th Prize in 2012

References

External links 

 Video of 13th International Henryk Wieniawski Violin Competition - 2006 - Gala Concert

Japanese classical violinists
Toho Gakuen School of Music alumni
Henryk Wieniawski Violin Competition prize-winners
Musicians from Tokyo
21st-century classical violinists
Women classical violinists
1989 births
Living people